Love Me Tender is an EP by Elvis Presley, containing the four songs from the motion picture of the same name. It was released by RCA Victor in November 1956.
The EP peaked at #9 on Top Pop Albums chart with sales of over 600,000, as well as making it to #35 on the singles chart. It was simultaneously certified Gold and Platinum by the Recording Industry Association of America on March 27, 1992.

Background 
The film was originally intended to be a straight acting role for Presley, but due to the popularity of the single "Love Me Tender" and Colonel Tom Parker's desire to promote Presley's films with a soundtrack and vice versa, four songs were added to the film. Parker would very seldom deviate from this formula for the remainder of Presley's film career.

Instead of a full long-playing album soundtrack, for Love Me Tender the four songs appearing in the film were released as an extended-play or E.P. seven-inch 45 RPM record on RCA Victor, Love Me Tender, catalog EPA 4006, during November 1956.

Content 
The four EP soundtrack songs were recorded at Fox's Stage One in Hollywood, at three sessions on August 24, September 4, and October 1, 1956. The title song was released as a single on September 28, 1956, and went to #1 on the singles chart. 

The music was based on the Civil War ballad "Aura Lee," with new lyrics by Ken Darby. Darby, in fact, wrote all of the soundtrack songs, but credited them to his wife, Vera Matson, while Parker cut his publishing company, Hill and Range, in on the royalties by further crediting the writing to Presley as well. A reprise of "Love Me Tender" was recorded on October 1 and is heard at the end of the film; this short track was not released until after Presley's death. The sessions for these songs were the only time in the decade that Presley recorded with musicians outside his regular coterie.

Track listing

Personnel
 Elvis Presley – vocals
 Vito Mumolo – lead acoustic guitar
 Luther Rountree – rhythm acoustic guitar
 Dom Frontieri – accordion on August 24
 Carl Fortina – accordion on September 4
 Mike "Myer" Rubin – double bass
 Richard Cornell – drums
 Rad Robinson – backing vocals
 Jon Dodson – backing vocals
 Charles Prescott – backing vocals

Charts

References

External links 
 
 Love Me Tender (EP) at AllMusic

Film soundtracks
1956 soundtrack albums
RCA Records soundtracks
Elvis Presley soundtracks
1956 EPs
Elvis Presley EPs
RCA Records EPs
Albums produced by Lionel Newman